Roy Sinclair Campbell Jr. (September 29, 1952 – January 9, 2014) was an American trumpeter frequently linked to free jazz, although he also performed rhythm and blues and funk during his career.

Biography
Born in Los Angeles, California, in 1952, Campbell was raised in New York City. At the age of fifteen, he began learning to play trumpet and soon studied at the Jazz Mobile program along with Kenny Dorham, Lee Morgan and Joe Newman. Throughout the 1960s, still unacquainted with the avant-garde movement, Campbell performed in the big bands of the Manhattan Community College. From the 1970s onwards,  he performed primarily within the context of free jazz, spending some of this period studying with Yusef Lateef. Campbell composed the film music for the documentary Survival in New York (1989) by Rosa von Praunheim.

In the early 1990s, Campbell moved to the Netherlands and performed regularly with Klaas Hekman and Don Cherry. In addition to leading his own groups, he performed with Yo La Tengo, William Parker, Peter Brötzmann, Matthew Shipp, and other improvisors. Upon returning to the United States he began leading his group Other Dimensions In Music and also formed the Pyramid Trio, a pianoless trio formed with William Parker.

He died in January 2014 of hypertensive atherosclerotic cardiovascular disease at the age of 61.

Discography

As leader
 New Kingdom (Delmark, 1992)
 La Tierra del Fuego (Delmark, 1994)
 Communion (Silkheart, 1995)
 Ancestral Homeland (No More, 1998)
 Ethnic Stew and Brew (Delmark, 2001)
 It's Krunch Time (Thirsty Ear, 2001)
 Akhenaten Suite (Aum Fidelity, 2008)

As co-leader
with Other Dimensions in Music
 Other Dimensions In Music (Silkheart, 1990)
 Now! (Aum Fidelity, 1998)
 Time Is of the Essence Is Beyond Time (Aum Fidelity, 2000)
 Live at the Sunset (Marge, 2007)
 Kaiso Stories (Silkheart, 2011)

with The Nu Band (Roy Campbell Jr., Mark Whitecage, Joe Fonda, Lou Grassi)
 Live at the Bop Shop (Clean Feed, 2001)
 Live (Konnex, 2005)
 The Dope and the Ghost (Not Two, 2007)
 Lower East Side Blues (Porter, 2009)
 Live in Paris (NoBusiness, 2010)
 Relentlessness Live at the Sunset (Marge, 2011)

with Joe McPhee, William Parker & Warren Smith
 Tribute to Albert Ayler Live at the Dynamo (Marge, 2009)

As sideman
with Billy Bang
Live at Carlos 1 (Soul Note, 1986)

with Peter Brötzmann's Die Like a Dog Quartet
From Valley to Valley (Eremite, 1998)

 with Peter Brötzmann Tentet + 2
 Short Visit to Nowhere (Okkadisk, 2002)
 Broken English (Okkadisk, 2002)

 with Rob Brown
 Jumping Off the Page (No More, 2000)
 The Big Picture (Marge, 2004)

 with Whit Dickey
 Coalescence (Clean Feed, 2004)
 In a Heartbeat (Clean Feed, 2005)
 Sacred Ground (Clean Feed, 2006)

with El-P
High Water (Thirsty Ear, 2004)

 with Ehran Elisha
 Sweet Empathy (Cadence, 1995)
 The Kicker (CIMP, 1998)
 Lowe Down Suite (CIMP, 1999)

 with Exuberance
 The Other Shore (Boxholder, 2003)
 Live at Vision Festival (Ayler, 2004)

with Garrison Fewell
 Variable Density Sound Orchestra (Creative Nation Music, 2009)

 with Yuko Fujiyama
 Re-entry (CIMP, 2001)

with Dennis Gonzalez
 Nile River Suite (Daagnim, 2004)

with Burton Greene
 Isms Out (CIMP, 2004)

with William Hooker Trio with Dave Soldier
Heart of the Sun (Engine Records, 2013)

 with Khan Jamal
 Balafon Dance (CIMP, 2002)

 with Adam Lane
 Blue Spirit Band (CIMP, 2013)
 Oh Freedom (CIMP, 2013)

 with Steve Lehman
 Structural Fire (CIMP, 2001)
 Camouflage (CIMP, 2002)

 with Maneri Ensemble
 Going to Church (Aum Fidelity, 2002)

with Jemeel Moondoc
 The Evening of the Blue Men (Muntu, 1979)
 New York Live! (Cadence, 1981)
 The Intrepid Live in Poland (Poljazz, 1981)
 The Athens Concert (Praxis, 1982)
Konstanze's Delight (Soul Note, 1983)
 Spirit House (Eremite, 2001)
 Live in Paris (Cadence, 2003)
 Live at the Vision Festival (Ayler, 2003)
 The Zookeeper's House (Relative Pitch, 2014)

with New Atlantis Octet
 Unto the Sun (Not Two. 2013)

 with Kevin Norton
 The Dream Catcher (CIMP, 2003)

 with William Parker
 Flowers Grow in my Room (Centering, 1994)
 Sunrise in the Tone World (AUM Fidelity, 1997)
 Mayor of Punkville (AUM Fidelity, 2000)
 Raincoat in the River (Eremite, 2001)
Spontaneous (Splasc(H), 2002)
 Mass for the Healing of the World (Black Saint, 2003)
 Fractured Dimensions (FMP, 2003)
 For Percy Heath (Victo, 2006)
 Essence of Ellington (Centering, 2012)

with Marc Ribot
Spiritual Unity (Pi recordings, 2005)

with Saheb Sarbib
 Live at the Public Theatre (Cadence, 1981)
 Aisha (Cadence, 1981)

 with Matthew Shipp
 Strata (hatOLOGY, 1998)
 Pastoral Composure (Thirsty Ear, 2000)

 with Alan Silva
 Alan Silva & the Sound Visions Orchestra (Eremite, 2001)
 H.Con.Res.57/Treasure Box (Eremite, 2003)

with Stone Quartet 
 Live at Vision Festival (Ayler, 2011)

 with Steve Swell
 Suite for Players, Listeners and Other Dreamers (CIMP, 2003)
 News from the Mystic Auricle (Not Two, 2008)

with Charles Tyler
 Live at Sweet Basil vol. 1 & 2 (1984) (Bleu Regard, 2006)

 with Yo La Tengo
 Summer Sun (Matador, 2003)

References

External links 

 Official site 

 Roy Campbell on Life brief spoken word video, Jalopy, Brooklyn, September 26, 2009. (Punkcast)

1952 births
2014 deaths
Musicians from Los Angeles
American jazz trumpeters
American male trumpeters
Free jazz trumpeters
20th-century American musicians
21st-century American musicians
20th-century trumpeters
21st-century trumpeters
Jazz musicians from California
20th-century American male musicians
21st-century American male musicians
American male jazz musicians
Other Dimensions In Music members
Thirsty Ear Recordings artists
NoBusiness Records artists